In agriculture and in the hobby of animal fancy, a breeder is an individual animal used for selective breeding.  A breeder is usually a purebred animal, bred with the intent of producing purebred, or even show-quality animals.  However, in some cases, a breeding animal is crossbred with another breed or a mixed breed with the intent of combining aspects of two or more different breeds.

Purebred and registered animals
If the breeding is for a purebred animal that will be used for exhibition or future breeding (pets or livestock), the animal must be registered and  conform to the criteria laid out for that breed in a breed standard kept by a central authority, such as a kennel club for dogs.  In addition, the breed club, kennel club, or other governing authority may have other restrictions on the type of animal that can be used for breeding to produce offspring that can be registered.

For example, some equine societies allow backbred and crossbred individuals to be bred from; most dog clubs do not except in exceptional circumstances, by permission.  Most kennel clubs allow any registered individual to be bred from; the individual breed club may have additional, stricter criteria.  The Mini Foxie Club of Australia, Inc., for example, requires adult dogs to be classified before being certified eligible for breeding of purebred Miniature Fox Terriers.  Some Jack Russell Terrier and Greater Swiss Mountain Dog clubs have similar requirements.

Terminology
In animal fancy, human breeders have specialized words for breeding animals in some species:
  (Please list only if different for the words for the male and female of the species.)
Cat:  Stud (male) and queen (female)
Cattle: Bull (male) and heifer or cow (female)
Dog: Stud (male) and brood bitch (female)
Horse: Stallion (male) and mare (female)
Pigeon: cock (male) and hen (female)
Sheep: Ram (male) and ewe (female)
Goat: Buck (male) and doe (female)
Guinea pig: Boar (male) sow (female)
Rabbit: Buck (male) Doe (female)
These should not be confused with the words for the parents of offspring (i.e. sire and dam) or with the words for male and female of the species (i.e. dog and bitch).  These terms specifically apply only to animals bred intentionally by serious animal breeders.

See also
Animal fancy
Dog breeding
Domestic sheep reproduction
American Kennel Club

References

External links
 breeders-international.com - The worldwide Community for Breeders

Animal breeding